Rhode Island Avenue (also known as Rhode Island Avenue–Brentwood) is a Washington Metro station in Washington, D.C. on the Red Line. The station is located in the Brentwood neighborhood of Northeast, on an elevated platform crossing Rhode Island Avenue NE (U.S. Route 1)

History

The station was built on land formerly part of the African-American Columbian Harmony Cemetery. When the Rhode Island Avenue – Brentwood Metro station was constructed in 1976, workers discovered that not all the bodies had been moved. At least five coffins were unearthed, and numerous bones. A plaque was affixed to a column near one of the station's entrances to commemorate the former cemetery. When a parking lot at the site was renovated in 1979, more bones and bits of cloth and coffins were unearthed.

Service began on March 27, 1976 as one of the first stations in the system, opening as the eastern terminus of the Red Line. It was replaced as the eastern terminus by Silver Spring on February 6, 1978.

From the time the station opened on March 27, 1976 all the way up until November 20, 2004, the station was originally just named, "Rhode Island Avenue". However; on November 20, 2004, during exactly the same time WMATA opened its brand new "New York Avenue - Florida Avenue - Galludet University" Metrorail Station in between the Rhode Island Avenue Metro Station & Union Station, the "Rhode Island Avenue" Metro Station, was officially renamed, "Rhode Island Avenue - Brentwood" in recognition of the Brentwood neighborhood in Northeast Washington D.C., which the station is located in. However; this particular name change of the Rhode Island Avenue Metro Station, was only initially reflected on WMATA's Metrorail Rider Guides, System Maps, and on most of WMATA's newer/updated Metrobus Schedules for each of the Metrobus Routes that served the Rhode Island Avenue Metro Station. The pylons and station signage, on the other hand, did not officially reflect the new name change of the station, until they were eventually replaced with brand new pylons and station signage during July/August, 2005.

In the summer of 2018 from July 21 to September 3, the station was shut down for platform repairs due to settling of the platform and decaying concrete caused by salty de-icer used in the winter.

Future improvements
In May 2018, Metro announced an extensive renovation of platforms at twenty stations across the system. The platforms at the Rhode Island Avenue–Brentwood station would be rebuilt starting in September 2020.

Station layout
The station's main entrance is located just south of Rhode Island Avenue on Washington Street N.E. The station's island platform is stated to have the highest elevation of any Metro station in the system.

Notable places nearby
 WMATA's Brentwood Rail Yard
 USPS Washington Main Office
 Edgewood Terrace Apartment Complex
 Basilica of the National Shrine of the Immaculate Conception Building

References

External links
 

 The Schumin Web Transit Center: Rhode Island Ave-Brentwood Station
 Rhode Island Avenue entrance from Google Maps Street View

Stations on the Red Line (Washington Metro)
Washington Metro stations in Washington, D.C.
Railway stations in the United States opened in 1976
1976 establishments in Washington, D.C.
African-American history of Washington, D.C.